Slavko Brezoski (10 June 1922 – 7 March 2017) was a Macedonian architect, urban planner, painter, writer and educator known for his works in the genre of modern architecture realised during the middle of the 20th Century in North Macedonia, Serbia, Croatia, Brazil and Libya.  He was professor and Dean at the Faculty of Architecture at the Ss. Cyril and Methodius University of Skopje.

Biography 
Born 1922 in Galičnik, Kingdom of Yugoslavia, Brezoski graduated in architecture at the University of Belgrade in 1950. Upon completing studies returns to Skopje and becomes a member of the art collective 'Denes' alongside Janko Konstantinov and Risto Šekerinski. Worked for design studio "Proektant"  from 1950 to 1961,  building company "Pelagonia" from 1961 to 1963. The winner of the national competition for the design of the Yugoslav Embassy in Brasilia. Travelled and worked with the construction team in Brasilia from 1962 to 1963.  Following the 1963 Skopje earthquake he returned to join the planning and rebuilding of the city  and worked for the design company "Makedonija Proekt" from 1963 to 1966.  Worked in Libya from 1966 to 1969 as a technical support and adviser to the Kingdom of Libya. Became professor and Dean of the Faculty for Architecture at the University of Skopje Cyril and Methodius from 1970 to 1987.

Architecture 

Brezoski designed and built modernist buildings in Socialist Federal Republic of Yugoslavia (SFRY). He heralds the first generation of modernists in postwar Architecture of Yugoslavia. He realised a large number of core projects including office, public and residential buildings. Realised projects in the former Yugoslav republics, Brazil and Libya.

Designed a style of modernism based on interest in human architecture that shapes a positive society and a belief in progress, or moving forward. Bold meaning and experimental new style and form, that relies on contemporary materials. His work was based on an analytical programmatic approach to the function of buildings and a rational use of new materials and structural innovation. The emphasis is on volume, composition, and minimal ornamentation, experimentation with form-shapes, colours, lines.

Building characteristics are clean and minimal lines, use of glass to enhance natural light to the interiors, open and well defined floor spaces, well combined modern and traditional materials and sensitive relationship to the environment.

He was influenced by Le Corbusier and other classical modernists but with a deeply rooted spirit of a traditional Balkan neimar:wikt:neimar.  Brezoski's is a prominent influence on the Architecture of North Macedonia and Architecture of Yugoslavia

Works 
 Bank Building 'Komunalna Banka', predecessor to Komercijalna banka Skopje in 1956
High Rise "Papagal" Skopje 1957
 Department Store 'Stokovna Kukja NaMa', Skopje in 1960.
 Multi-story office building 'Rabotnički Dom', Skopje in 1962
 Yugoslav Embassy in Brazil, Brasilia in 1963
Idris Housing Complex, Tripoli, Libya 1968
Hotel Slavija, Popova Šapka
 Orthodox Cathedral Church of St. Clement of Ohrid in 1972–1990
Retreat Šamarica, Zrinska Gora, Croatia in 1980
 Hotel 'Neda' Galičnik in 1980

Awards 
Awarded, "11 October" Republic Award, in the field of Culture and Art for the building of "Rabotnički Dom" in 1963
Awarded, City of Skopje Award "13 November", 1964.
Award at the Biannual of Macedonian Architecture 1981.
Received the Andrey Damyanov Award for Architecture in 1993, for his lifetime achievements as an architect and for his contribution to the development of Macedonian architecture

Books 
Publications by Slavko Brezoski in Macedonian
Rekanska Kukja: Arhitektonsko Nasledstvo vo Makedonija, Skopje, 1993
ZaArhitektonskiRaboti, published by Faculty the of Architecture University of Skopje in 2007

Gallery

References

External links 
 http://www.slavkobrezoski.com
 MARH.MK Slavko Brezoski Retrospective
 Faculty of Architecture University of Skopje

Architecture in North Macedonia
1922 births
2017 deaths
People from Galičnik
Architects from Skopje
Yugoslav architects
Academic staff of the Ss. Cyril and Methodius University of Skopje